Sandwich (stylized as <S>andwich in earlier releases) is a Filipino alternative rock band from the Philippines. The band consists of lead vocalist Raymund Marasigan, guitarists and backing vocalists Diego Castillo and Mong Alcaraz, bassist Myrene Academia and drummer Mike Dizon.

History

Formation and Grip Stand Throw (1998–2000)
The band formed in 1998 by Raymund Marasigan (former drummer of Eraserheads) and Diego Castillo (The Aga Mulach Experience) for the purpose of fulfilling their mutual desire to work together. When Raymund Marasigan saw The Aga Muhlach Experience in a gig, he told Diego that he wanted to form a band that sounds like Weezer and Whales. He then recruited Diego Castillo and his band mates from The Aga Muhlach Experience - Mike Dizon (Teeth and Pedicab) to play drums, as well as bassist Myrene Academia (Imago & Duster). Sandwich was searching for a vocalist when music video director Marie Jamora recommended her friend Marc Abaya (Kjwan). A few years earlier, Marasigan was a judge at a contest where Marc Abaya with his high-school band, Shirley Beans were part of. Abaya then joined Sandwich. When Abaya and Marasigan met each other, they jammed together performing Beastie Boys "Sabotage" for 10 minutes.

Although existing simultaneously with the Marasigan's band at that time, Eraserheads, Sandwich provided a heavier, grittier sound, and built up their own fan base. Abaya was still in college at the time, and Marasigan would still tour occasionally with the Eraserheads, but these weren’t hindering factors for Sandwich, as there were many session musicians ready to take over in case of a member's absence.

In 1999, they signed with Sony Music. and released their debut album, Grip Stand Throw, with much success, thanks to its carrier single, "Butterfly Carnival." The band won three awards at the 1999 NU 107 Rock Awards: Album of the Year, Best New Artist, and Song of the Year.

4-Track Mind (2000–2003)
The following year, Sandwich released their second album 4-Track Mind on July 30, 2001. which was not successful as their debut album. It was honored as Album of the Year at the 2001 NU Rock Awards. The album name came from Marc Abaya's 4-track recorder, which he brought into the studio that contains a demo. Singer Marc Abaya considers this as his most personal album.

Thanks to the Moon's Gravitational Pull and Marc Abaya's departure (2003–2005)
The year 2003 marked a critical time for Sandwich. That year, recording label Sony Music decided to drop the band. The following year, 2004, Sandwich took the independent route and recorded their third album Thanks to the Moon's Gravitational Pull. Eventually, they signed with PolyEast Records. The album's hit tracks were "Two Trick Pony", "Masilungan" and "Nahuhulog."

While in Sandwich, Marc Abaya formed the band Kjwan with his long-time friends and former high school band-mates and fellow Ateneans Kelley Mangahas, Jorel Corpus, J-hoon Balbuena.

Later in 2013, Marc would reveal in an interview with Radio Republic that Raymund once told him that Shirley Beans must reform. Marc interpreted this as Raymund telling him that some of his materials didn't fit Sandwich. At the time of the supposed conversation between Raymund and Marc, the latter was having difficulty managing his job as an MTV VJ, and his obligations to his other band, Kjwan.

On February 20, 2005, Marc Abaya left Sandwich and cited "loaded work" as his reason. In an interview with Radio Republic, Abaya said that he regrets leaving Sandwich without giving a proper farewell to the band. They remain good friends and they reunite to play a few songs from time to time.

Five on the Floor & Mainstream success (2006–2008)
After Abaya's departure, Raymund Marasigan assumed main vocal duties. They remained a 5-piece band by bringing in guitarist Mong Alcaraz from Chicosci. The band wrote songs for soundtracks, including "Humanda Ka" for the online game Tantra, and "Nginig" for the ABS-CBN television program of the same name.

In early 2006, Sandwich released their fourth album, Five on the Floor. This was their first album with Marasigan as the sole frontman. In late October 2006, their songs "Sugod" and "DVDX" became available on the online music game O2Jam. The video for "Sugod" won five major awards at the 2006 MTV Pilipinas Music Awards, including Video of the Year, Best Director, and Best Editing. In the same year, Sandwich members Mong Alcaraz and Myrene Acamedia won the Best Guitarist and Best Bassist awards at the NU Rock Awards. The following year, "DVDX" won the Best Music Video award from the same awards show. Their former vocalist Marc Abaya expressed appreciation for the album(Five on the Floor). He stated that "he cried because of happiness for his former band" and said that the sound of the fifth album is what sandwich's sound was meant to be.

In 2007, Sandwich performed "Zaido", the theme song for the fantaserye action series Zaido: Pulis Pangkalawakan, which aired on GMA 7.  The song was written by Raymund Marasigan.

S Mark the Spot & Continuous success (2009–2010)
In 2008, their fifth album, <S> Marks the Spot, was released. The album received recognition from various awards shows, thanks to its hit singles "Procrastinator" and "Betamax." In celebration of their 10th year in the industry, Sandwich briefly reunited with former vocalist Marc Abaya in a series of anniversary shows.

This year also started the 4-year relationship with Tanduay as Sandwich became part of Tanduay's First Five where five of the most popular bands in the country had a nationwide tour playing their hits.

Five on the Floor, Fat Salt & Flame, Debris, Under the glow of the Satellite concert (2010–2020)
In 2010, Sandwich launched their sixth studio album, Contra Tiempo featuring the single "Putik", which the band dedicates to the victims of Typhoon Ondoy (international name Ketsana). "Lakad" was released as the second single from the album.

2012 was a year where the band had a chance to travel and share their music to different countries. They participated in the Hong Kong Clockenflap Music and Arts Festival, Malaysia's Future Music Festival and the Hollywood Bowl with Apl de Ap of the Black Eyed Peas in Los Angeles, California, USA.

In April 2013, they released the album, Fat Salt & Flame, under Polyeast Records. A year after the release of Fat Salt & Flame, they released their 8th album under Polyeast Records entitled Debris with the carrier single "Kagulo". It was released on February 12, 2015, through PolyEast Records. It was launched on February 25, 2015, at the UP Town Center in Quezon City, Philippines. The album design of Debris featured destroyed and disassembled audio electronics like a Fostex cassette track which was first used as album cover for "4 Track Mind" and a Tascam minidisc track used for the production of Sandwich's "Grip, Stand Throw", Squid9's "Ink Jet", and Eraserheads' "Natin99" and "Carbonstereoxide". In 2014, Sandwich headlined P-Fest UK, performing in Leeds and London, United Kingdom together with other Filipino bands Top Junk, Squid 9, The Diegos, Pedicab and Yano, as well as UK-based Filipino bands. In 2017, they took part at the Coke Studio Philippines Project, they collaborated with young electronic artist BP Valenzuela.

In 2018, Sandwich celebrated their 20th Year by releasing a new single called 'Time Lapse'. It was released on February 1, 2018. They held their Anniversary Show on April 13, 2018, at the Metrotent Convention Center Pasig.

No Goodbyes EP (2020–present)
On May 20, 2022, the band released their first EP, No Goodbyes, a 5-track list featuring their lead single of the same title and "Buhol Buhol" (both were released in 2020 before the COVID-19 pandemic). Production of these songs were recorded at a private place in Batangas for 3 days, although other recordings were done at both their residences and at Kodama Studios as well as the help from Buddy Zabala for Marasigan's vocals in pre-production.

Influences
Sandwich cited influence are Foo Fighters, Weezer, Sonic Youth, Superchunk, Beck, Beastie Boys, Whale, The Cure, Led Zeppelin, The Doors, Nine Inch Nails, Korn, Red Hot Chili Peppers, Pantera, Deftones and LCD Soundsystem. The band's main influences are Weezer and Whale. During a performance at 19 East in Sucat, Philippines, Raymund mentioned that they want to be awesome like Foo Fighters, indie like Sonic Youth and hip-hop like Beastie Boys. When Marc was the vocalist of the band, he mentioned in the interview that his main influence was Led Zeppelin, Jim Morrison of The Doors. Myrene and Mong also mentioned their admiration for LCD Soundsystem.

Band members
Current members
Raymund Marasigan  - lead vocals, keyboards, additional guitar, percussion (2005–present); rhythm guitar, co-lead and backing vocals (1998-2005) 
Diego Castillo - rhythm and lead guitar, backing vocals (1998–present)
Myrene Academia - bass guitar, aerophones, occasional backing vocals (1998–present)
Mong Alcaraz - lead guitar, backing vocals, keyboards (2005–present)
Mike Dizon - drums (1998–present)

Former member
Marc Abaya - co-lead and backing vocals, lead guitar (1998-2005)

Sessionists
Enzo Hermosa - drums
Eco Del Rio - bass

Discography

Studio albums
Grip Stand Throw (1999)
4-Track Mind (2000)
Thanks to the Moon's Gravitational Pull (2003)
Five on the Floor (2006)
<S> Marks the Spot (2008)
Contra Tiempo (2010)
Fat Salt & Flame (2013)
Debris (2015)

Extended plays
No Goodbyes (2022)

Soundtracks
Tantra Neo Oriental Fantasy (2005)
Humanda Ka Music Video
Humanda Ka OST
Humanda Ka (Minus One)
Rounin OST (2007)
"Humanda Ka"
Nginig OST
"Nginig"
Super Noypi OST
"Super Noypi"
Mga Awit Kapuso: The Best Of GMA Themes Vol. 4 (2008)
Zaido: Pulis Pangkalawakan OST
"Zaido"

Commercial jingles
 Smart Bro jingle
 Modified version of Sugod for Smart Communications' wireless internet service
 Coca-Cola Philippines commercial jingle
 Buhay Coke (2008) and Open Coca-Cola, Open Happiness (2009)
 Chiz Escudero's campaign jingle
 Modified version of Sugod 
 Frenzy Condoms
 Are We Good
 Cafe Puro
 Modified version of Betamax

Compilations
The 2 in 1 Series: Sandwich

Collaborations
Full Volume (2004)
"Right Now (Morse Immediate Mix)"
Pinoy Ako(2005)
"Humanda Ka"
Kami nAPO Muna (2006)
"Bakit Ang Babae"
CloseUp Season of Smiles Christmas Album (2006)
"Close Encounter"
Sakto Sa Pasko Christmas Album (2008)
"Simbang Gabi"
I-Star 15: The Best Of Alternative & Rock Songs (2010)
"Humanda Ka"

Singles
 "Grip, Stand, Throw"
 "Butterfly Carnival"
 "Sakyan"
 "Art To Di Too"
 "Maybe"
 "Food for the Soul"
 "Hairpin"
 "Sometimes"
 "Right Now"
 "Two Trick Pony"
 "Nahuhulog"
 "Humanda Ka" (Tantra Soundtrack)
 "Masilungan"
 "Sugod"
 "Walang Kadala-dala"
 "DVDX"
 "Super Noypi" for the movie of the same name
 "Sunburn"
 "Zaido (Pulis Pangkalawakan)" for the TV series of the same name
 "Procrastinator"
 "Betamax"
 "Selos"
 "Manila"
 "Putik"
 "Lakad"
 "Pera Pera"
 "Back for More"
 "Mayday"
 "Kagulo"
 "Border Crossing"
 "New Romancer"
 "Time Lapse"

Awards and nominations

References

External links
 
 Sandwich Facebook page
 Sandwich Instagram page
 EMI Philippines - Sandwich
 Poptimes Magazine Interview
 Sandwich Pinoybanda Profile
 Listen Sandwich music stream
 Sandwich on purevolume
https://web.archive.org/web/20060902005117/http://mtvasia.com/News/200109/18005652.html

Filipino rock music groups
Musical groups established in 1998
PolyEast Records artists
Sony Music Philippines artists